Finn Bilous  (born 22 September 1999) is a New Zealand freestyle skier who competes internationally. He represented New Zealand in slopestyle at the 2018 Winter Olympics in PyeongChang. He finished 13th, just one spot short of making the finals (only 0.8 of a point behind). He participated at the FIS Freestyle Ski and Snowboarding World Championships 2018, winning a medal at the Big Air competition (3rd place). 

Bilous is representing New Zealand at the 2022 Winter Olympics in Beijing, China.

References

External links

1999 births
Living people
New Zealand male freestyle skiers 
Olympic freestyle skiers of New Zealand
Freestyle skiers at the 2018 Winter Olympics
Freestyle skiers at the 2022 Winter Olympics
Freestyle skiers at the 2016 Winter Youth Olympics